Benjamin Roy Armstrong Jr. (born September 9, 1967) is an American former professional basketball player. Armstrong won three NBA championships during his career as a point guard for the Chicago Bulls.

Early life
Armstrong was born in Detroit, Michigan and attended Brother Rice High School in Bloomfield Township, Michigan. He graduated in 1985.

Playing career

College career
Armstrong had an illustrious career at the University of Iowa as the Hawkeyes' all-time leader in assists with 517 upon graduation; and is currently ranked sixth all-time. He also ranked sixth on the school's all-time steals list (178) and fourth in total points (1,705). The 6-foot-2 guard shot .443 (136-of-307) from three-point range over his four-year career and averaged 18.6 points and 5.4 assists as a senior. Armstrong received his bachelor's degree from Iowa in May 1989.

National Basketball Association

Chicago Bulls
Selected by the Chicago Bulls in the first round of the 1989 NBA draft, the 6'2" (1.88 m) Armstrong helped the team return to the Eastern Conference Finals after compiling 55 regular season victories in 1990.

In 1991, he helped them win their first NBA title against the Los Angeles Lakers after winning 61 games. In 1992, Armstrong averaged double-digit scoring while coming off the bench behind longtime starter John Paxson to help the Bulls win 67 games and their second straight title. In 1993, he locked down the starting job, contributing to a 57–25 record and the Bulls' third straight title. He also claimed the NBA's three-point field goal percentage crown with a mark of .453 on 63-for-139 shooting.

In 1994, he emerged as more of a leader in the wake of Michael Jordan's abrupt retirement, placing third on the team in scoring. He was voted a starter in the 1994 NBA All-Star Game, finished second in the NBA in three-point field goal percentage at .444 while leading the team to a 55–27 record and a second-round exit from the playoffs.

Armstrong finished third in scoring again in 1995 as the Bulls posted a 47–35 record, and with Jordan, Scottie Pippen and Toni Kukoč, led the team to the second round again.

Golden State Warriors
Armstrong was the first player chosen in the 1995 NBA Expansion Draft (via Toronto Raptors) but refused to report. He was traded by the Raptors to the Golden State Warriors in exchange for Carlos Rogers and 4 other players and played for the Warriors in 1996 and in 1997.

Charlotte Hornets
Four games into the 1997–98 season, he was acquired by the Charlotte Hornets, playing 62 games that year. 
He also played 10 games for the Hornets in the 1999 season before being signed by the Orlando Magic in March of that year.

Orlando Magic
Armstrong was signed by the Orlando Magic in March of the 1998–99 NBA season.

Return to Chicago
On August 30, 1999, he was again signed by the Bulls and played the 1999–2000 season and retired at the end of the season, ending his career with the team that drafted him and with which he spent much of his playing career.

Later endeavors
Armstrong stepped into Chicago's front office as a special assistant to Vice President of Basketball Operations Jerry Krause. Having replaced Paxson as the Bulls' starting point guard years before, Armstrong was himself replaced by Paxson as hire to the GM job in Chicago when Krause resigned in 2003. Armstrong remained with the organization as a scout for a couple of seasons, leaving in 2005.

Armstrong served as a basketball analyst for ESPN's NBA Fast Break series. Since 2006 he has also been employed by Wasserman Media Group, a sports marketing and representation group out of Los Angeles, California representing professional athletes and entertainers. He currently serves as an agent for Knicks  point guard Derrick Rose, who was the first player selected in the 2008 NBA draft. He also serves as an agent for Bismack Biyombo, Emmanuel Mudiay, Donatas Motiejūnas, JaVale McGee, Denzel Valentine, and Josh Jackson.

NBA career statistics

Regular season 

|-
| style="text-align:left;"| 
| style="text-align:left;"|Chicago
| 81 || 0 || 15.9 || .485 || .500 || .885 || 1.3 || 2.5 || 0.6 || 0.1 || 5.6
|-
| style="text-align:left;background:#afe6ba;"|  †
| style="text-align:left;"|Chicago
| 82 || 0 || 21.1 || .481 || .500 || .874 || 1.8 || 3.7 || 0.9 || 0.0 || 8.8
|-
| style="text-align:left;background:#afe6ba;"|  †
| style="text-align:left;"|Chicago
| 82 || 3 || 22.9 || .481 || .402 || .806 || 1.8 || 3.2 || 0.6 || 0.1 || 9.9
|-
| style="text-align:left;background:#afe6ba;"|  †
| style="text-align:left;"|Chicago
| 82 || 74 || 30.4 || .499 || .453 || .861 || 1.8 || 4.0 || 0.8 || 0.1 || 12.3
|-
| style="text-align:left;"| 
| style="text-align:left;"|Chicago
| 82 || 82 || 33.8 || .476 || .444 || .855 || 2.1 || 3.9 || 1.0 || 0.1 || 14.8
|-
| style="text-align:left;"| 
| style="text-align:left;"|Chicago
| 82 || 82 || 31.4 || .468 || .427 || .884 || 2.3 || 3.0 || 1.0 || 0.1 || 14.0
|-
| style="text-align:left;"| 
| style="text-align:left;"|Golden State
| 82 || 64 || 27.6 || .468 || .473 || .839 || 2.2 || 4.9 || 0.8 || 0.1 || 12.3
|-
| style="text-align:left;"| 
| style="text-align:left;"|Golden State
| 49 || 17 || 20.8 || .453 || .278 || .861 || 1.5 || 2.6 || 0.5 || 0.0 || 7.9
|-
| style="text-align:left;"| 
| style="text-align:left;"|Golden State
| 4 || 0 || 14.8 || .316 || .000 || .714 || 1.8 || 1.5 || 1.0 || 0.0 || 4.3
|-
| style="text-align:left;"| 
| style="text-align:left;"|Charlotte
| 62 || 0 || 12.5 || .510 || .265 || .860 || 1.1 || 2.3 || 0.4 || 0.0 || 3.9
|-
| style="text-align:left;"| 
| style="text-align:left;"|Charlotte
| 10 || 1 || 17.8 || .488 || .750 || .900 || 1.6 || 2.7 || 0.3 || 0.0 || 5.7
|-
| style="text-align:left;"| 
| style="text-align:left;"|Orlando
| 22 || 0 || 8.2 || .422 || .143 || .818 || 1.0 || 1.5 || 0.4 || 0.0 || 2.2
|-
| style="text-align:left;"| 
| style="text-align:left;"|Chicago
| 27 || 18 || 21.6 || .446 || .448 || .880 || 1.7 || 2.9 || 0.3 || 0.0 || 7.4
|- class="sortbottom"
| style="text-align:center;" colspan="2"| Career
| 747 || 341 || 23.8 || .477 || .425 || .856 || 1.8 || 3.3 || 0.7 || 0.1 || 9.8
|- class="sortbottom"
| style="text-align:center;" colspan="2"| All-Star
| 1 || 1 || 22.0 || .556 || .500 || – || 1.0 || 4.0 || 0.0 || 0.0 || 11.0

Playoffs 

|-
|style="text-align:left;"|1990
|style="text-align:left;"|Chicago
|16||0||13.6||.339||.000||.917||1.3||1.8||0.6||0.0||4.0
|-
| style="text-align:left;background:#afe6ba;"|1991†
|style="text-align:left;"|Chicago
|17||0||16.1||.500||.600||.800||1.6||2.5||1.1||0.1||5.5
|-
| style="text-align:left;background:#afe6ba;"|1992†
|style="text-align:left;"|Chicago
|22||0||19.7||.453||.294||.789||1.1||2.1||0.6||0.0||7.3
|-
| style="text-align:left;background:#afe6ba;"|1993†
|style="text-align:left;"|Chicago
|19||19||33.8||.524||.512||.909||1.5||3.3||1.0||0.1||11.4
|-
| style="text-align:left;"|1994
|style="text-align:left;"|Chicago
|10||10||36.0||.519||.583||.818||2.4||2.5||0.8||0.0||15.3
|-
| style="text-align:left;"|1995
|style="text-align:left;"|Chicago
|10||10||28.8||.456||.448||.818||1.8||2.7||0.6||0.0||10.3
|-
| style="text-align:left;"|1998
|style="text-align:left;"|Charlotte
|9||0||16.2||.381||.400||.750||1.1||2.0||0.7||0.0||4.1
|-
| style="text-align:left;"|1999
|style="text-align:left;"|Orlando
|2||0||1.5||.000||–||–||0.0||0.5||0.0||0.0||0.0
|- class="sortbottom"
| style="text-align:center;" colspan="2"| Career
| 105 || 39 || 22.5 || .471 || .451 || .832 || 1.4 || 2.4 || 0.8 || 0.0 || 7.9

References

External links
 Career statistics  databasebasketball.com
 NBA Profile NBA.com
 Catholic High School Hall of Fame Info aodonline.org
 Interview with B. J. Armstrong SportsAgentBlog.com

1967 births
20th-century African-American sportspeople
21st-century African-American people
African-American basketball players
American men's basketball players
American sports agents
Basketball players from Detroit
Brother Rice High School (Michigan) alumni
Charlotte Hornets players
Chicago Bulls draft picks
Chicago Bulls players
Golden State Warriors players
Iowa Hawkeyes men's basketball players
Living people
Medalists at the 1987 Summer Universiade
National Basketball Association All-Stars
Orlando Magic players
Point guards
Toronto Raptors expansion draft picks
Universiade medalists in basketball
Universiade silver medalists for the United States